Celebrity Name Game may refer to:
 Celebrity Name Game (American TV series), an American game show
 Celebrity Name Game (Australian TV series), an Australian spin-off game show